The Abraham Bisson House is a historic stone house in Jordan, Minnesota, United States, built in 1884. It was the home of Abraham Bisson (1827–1902) and is now listed on the National Register of Historic Places.  It was nominated for its local sandstone masonry and association with the now-vanished town of St. Lawrence.

References

Houses completed in 1884
Houses in Scott County, Minnesota
Houses on the National Register of Historic Places in Minnesota
National Register of Historic Places in Scott County, Minnesota